Jón Bjarki Magnússon (born 30 June 1984) is an Icelandic journalist and independent documentary filmmaker. He studied creative writing at the University of Iceland (2012) and received his MA in Visual and Media Anthropology from Freie Universität, Berlin (2018).

Biography 
Magnússon's journalistic work include award-winning journalism on the conditions of refugees and asylum-seekers in his home country and the leaked memo case which led to the resignation of then Minister of the Interior Hanna Birna Kristjánsdóttir .

His short film, Even Asteroids Are Not Alone (2018), was awarded Royal Anthropological Institute's (RAI) Short Film Prize for ‘the most outstanding short film on social, cultural and biological anthropology or archaeology’ in 2019. His first feature documentary, Half Elf (2020), won the Grand Jury Prize at Skjaldborg, Icelandic Documentary Film Festival in 2020, and has been nominated for several prizes at key European film festivals.

He is the founder of SKAK bíófilm, a small Icelandic production company dedicated to making anthropological and artistic films. He is a regular contributor to the Icelandic bi-weekly newspaper Stundin and does project work for Filmmaking For Fieldwork (F4F™), an educational project offering training in audio-visual research methods, ethnographic and documentary filmmaking.

References

External links 
 Jón Bjarki Magnússon

1984 births
Living people
Free University of Berlin alumni
University of Iceland alumni